J-Horror Theater (Jホラーシアター, J horā shiatā) 2004 – 2010 is an anthology of 6 Japanese horror films produced by producer Takashige Ichise (一瀬 隆重, ichise takashige). Spurred on by the overwhelming success of the 1998 J-horror film Ringu (リング), a group of six directors (Masayuki Ochiai 落合正幸, Norio Tsuruta 鶴田 法男, Takashi Shimizu 清水 崇, Kiyoshi Kurosawa 黒沢 清, Hideo Nakata 中田 秀夫, Hiroshi Takahashi 高橋 洋) were requested to create a horror film to be released under Producer Ichise's J-Horror Theater anthology.

Films

Infection (2004) 
Infection (感染, kansen), Dir. Masayuki Ochiai (落合正幸, ochiai masayuki)

Original Japanese release date: 2 October 2004. Officially released in theaters as a double feature with Premonition and on DVD as part of the J-Horror Theater series.

Premonition (2004) 
Premonition (予言, yogen) Dir. Norio Tsuruta (鶴田 法男, tsuruta norio)

Original Japanese release date: 2 October 2004. Officially released in theaters as a double feature with Infection and on DVD as part of the J-Horror Theater series.

Reincarnation (2006) 
Reincarnation (輪廻, rin'ne) Dir. Takashi Shimizu ( 清水 崇, shimizu takashi)

Official Japanese release date: 7 January 2006. Originally screened at the Tokyo International Film Festival in October 2005. Officially released in Japanese theaters as part of the J-Horror Theater series. It was then released on DVD and in US theaters as part of the After Dark Horrorfest (also known as 8 films to Die For) in 2006.

Retribution (2007) 
Retribution (叫, sakebi) Dir. Kiyoshi Kurosawa (黒沢 清, kurosawa kiyoshi)

Official Japanese release date: 24 February 2007, Originally screened at the Venice Film Festival in September 2006. Was not officially released as a J-Horror Theater entry.

Kaidan (2007) 
Kaidan (怪談, kaidan) Dir. Hideo Nakata (中田 秀夫, nakata hideo)

Original Japanese release date: 4 August 2007. Was not officially released as a J-Horror Theater entry.

Kyōfu (2010) 
Kyōfu (恐怖, kyōfu) also known as The Sylvian Experiments Dir. Hiroshi Takahashi (高橋 洋, takahashi hiroshi)

Original Japanese release date: 10 July 2010. Officially released as part of the J-Horror Theater series and is the final film instalment. It holds significance as the film is directed and produced by the pair responsible for Ringu that began the J-Horror Theater anthology.

The official Kyōfu trailer also suggests that Kaidan and Sakebi were part of the series, as at the beginning it shows clips from all 5 films with their release dates, 2004–2007, followed by the Kyôfu preview. no

References 

 
Japanese horror fiction
Japanese-language films
Japanese horror films
Horror anthologies